Filey railway station is a Grade II* listed station opened in 1846 on the Hull to Scarborough Line, which serves the town of Filey in North Yorkshire, England.

It is operated by Northern Trains, who provide all passenger train services.

History

The station was on the York and North Midland Railway's branch from its York to Scarborough Railway (opened 1845) at Seamer to Bridlington, part of which connected to the Hull and Selby Railway (Bridlington branch) at Bridlington; both branches were sanctioned in 1845 and opened in 1846.

The station building was completed in 1846 to the designs of G.T. Andrews; a single storey red brick structure with slate roof and sandstone dressings, with a  7 bay main entrance projected from the station. The trainshed roof was common Andrew's design using a wrought iron truss structure supporting a wood and slate roof.

The first train ran from Seamer station on 5 October 1846, arriving at 1 pm, with a large celebration and dinner including the presence of George Hudson. The regular service began the following day.

The rail facilities at Filey also included a goods shed, also an Andrew's design, on the opposite side of the level crossing northwest of the station, and a coal depot with sidings to the south east of the station, and a gas works adjacent to it.

A North Eastern Railway footbridge was added . In the 19th century there were also ticket platforms.

Goods traffic to Filey ceased in 1964, as part of the Beeching reforms.

In the 1960s one end of the hipped roof was removed along with the ventilated roof lantern, the other end in the 1970s. In 1985 the building was given listed building status. In 1988 BR sought planning permission to remove the roof entirely but was refused, instead the roof was reconstructed including the hipped ends, at an eventual cost of over £450,000 funded by BR, heritage bodies, and the town and borough councils.

The signal box at the north end was closed and removed in 2000, when the entire Bridlington to Seamer section was re-signalled and control of the signals and level crossing passed to the remaining box at the latter station. Automatic barriers replaced the old manual wooden crossing gates here as part of this work.

Facilities
Although the main buildings remain, the station is unstaffed; Northern installed a new ticket vending machine here in August 2018.  Waiting rooms are available for use during the day on each platform.  Train running information is provided by telephone and timetable posters.  There is step-free access to each platform via the level crossing at the north end.

Services
Until May 2019, there were nine trains a day in each direction on weekdays, northbound to Scarborough and southwards to Bridlington and Hull, with many of the latter running through to Doncaster and Sheffield.  Sunday services now operate throughout the year since the December 2009 timetable alterations, with six trains in each direction calling.

Since the summer 2019 timetable was introduced on 20 May, an hourly service now runs from here in both directions all week (including Sundays).  Weekday & Saturday trains normally terminate at Hull southbound, but on Sundays these run through to Sheffield (this will also apply throughout the week from the December 2019 timetable change).

Notes

References

Sources

Further reading

External links

Railway stations in the Borough of Scarborough
DfT Category F1 stations
Grade II* listed buildings in North Yorkshire
Grade II* listed railway stations
Railway stations in Great Britain opened in 1846
Northern franchise railway stations
Filey
Stations on the Hull to Scarborough line
1846 establishments in England
Former York and North Midland Railway stations
George Townsend Andrews railway stations